Tuski is a Bengali social drama film directed by Aniket Chattopadhyay and produced by Pradip Churiwal. This film was released on 24 August 2018 in the banner of Macneill Media Private Limited.

Plot 
This is a story of the disparity between two girl child from rich and poor section of the society. Tuski, a poor girl was born unsung and lives in a family in a slum. She lost her mother just after her birth and was raised by her aunt Ranita. Tuski's father Subrata is an auto-rickshaw driver. For them struggle for survival is more valid than raising issues on morality. Ranita works as a household maid in the family of Tua, another child of Tuski’s age who lives in a highrise beside the slum. While Tua and Tuski get friendly Tua’s mother become over conscious about the difference of their social status. One day Ranita gets sacked from her job on the excuse of Tua picking up a foul word from Tuski, and out of rage against injustice and insult, Ranita would get Tuski admitted to the same English medium school where Tua’s mother wants her daughter to be in.

Cast
 Kharaj Mukherjee as De souja
 Rajesh Sharma as Tuski's father
 Anamika Saha
 Priyanka Dutta as Tuski
 Moumi Basu as Tua
 Kanchona Moitra as Ranita
 Poulomi Basu
 Pradip Mukhopadhyay
 Krishnokishor Mukherjee
Saurav Chakrabarty

References

Indian drama films
2018 films
Films about poverty in India
Films directed by Aniket Chattopadhyay
Bengali-language Indian films
2010s Bengali-language films
2018 drama films